A heat meter or energy meter is a device which measures thermal energy provided by a source or delivered to a sink, by measuring the flow rate of the heat transfer fluid and the change in its temperature (ΔT) between the outflow and return legs of the system. It is typically used in industrial plants for measuring boiler output and heat taken by process, and for district heating systems to measure the heat delivered to consumers.

It can be used to measure the heat output of say a heating boiler, or the cooling output from a chiller unit.

In Europe heat meters have to comply with the measuring instruments directive MID Annex VI MI-004 if the meters are used for custody transfer.

Elements
A heat meter consists of

 a fluid flow meter - typically a turbine-type flow meter, or alternatively an ultrasonic flow meter;
 a means of measuring the temperature between the outffow and the inflow - usually a pair of thermocouples;
 a means of integrating the two measurements over a period of time - typically half an hour - and accumulating the total heat transfer in a given period.

Heat Metering Technologies 
Superstatic:

Principle:   The main part of the flow passes through a Venturi nozzle in the pipe,  creating the differential pressure to bypass the other part of the flow   through the fluid oscillator. pressure oscillations are converted into an   electric signal by a piezo sensor and detected by the integrator

Approval Rating  Class 2 MID

Billing Approved  Yes

RHI Approved  Yes

Power Supply  Battery / Mains

Mechanical:

Principle:  A traditional pulsed mechanical water meter supplied with   a separate integrator for energy calculation

Approval Rating  Class 3 MID (due to the Class 3 rating on the mechanical meter)

Billing Approved  Not for non domestic

RHI Approved  Not for non domestic

Power Supply  Battery / Mains

Ultrasonic:

Principle:  working on the Doppler frequency sensors installed in upstream and   down stream  picking up flow and disturbance along the pipe and   compensated by a temperature sensor.

Approval Rating  Class 2 MID

Billing Approved  Yes

RHI Approved  Yes

Power Supply  Battery / Mains

UK Heat Meter Regulations

•For any non domestic application where the meter will be used for Billing (including sub metering) the meter must be MID Class 2 approved - Class 3 is not suitable.

•Class 3 meters can be used for domestic billing

•Heat meters used for non domestic RHI (Renewable Heat Incentive) must also comply with accuracy class 2 or better of the Measuring instrument directive(MID)

See also
District heating
Heat cost allocator
Heating system
Thermometer

References

Thermometers